The Enciso Group is a geological formation in La Rioja, Spain whose strata date back to the Early Cretaceous.

The turtle Camerochelys was described from the Enciso Group. Dinosaur remains are among the fossils that have been recovered from the formation.

Fossil content

Correlation

See also 
 List of dinosaur-bearing rock formations

References

Bibliography

Further reading 

 M. Melero Rubio and F. Pérez Lorente. 2011. Huellas en las obras. Reconocimiento y estudio de huellas fo?siles de dinosaurio en las obras de la presa de Enciso (La Rioja. Espan?a) [Footprints in the works. Recognition and study of fossil dinosaur footprints in the works of the Enciso dam (La Rioja. Spain)]. Zubía 29:31-60
 A. Pérez García, X. Murelaga, J. A. Torres, L. I. Viera, and F.-R. Sáez Benito. 2010. Tortugas del Cretácico Inferior (Hauteriviense–Barremiense) de La Rioja (Cuenca de Cameros, España) [Turtles from the Lower Cretaceous (Hauterivian–Barremian) of La Rioja (Cameros Basin, Spain)]. Geogaceta 48:87-90
 I. Díaz Martínez, F. Pérez Lorente, X. Pereda Suberbiola and J. I. Canudo. 2009. Iguanodon-like footprints from the Enciso Group (Aptian, Lower Cretaceous) of La Rioja (Cameros Basin, Spain). In P. Godefroit & O. Lambert (ed.), Tribute to Charles Darwin and Bernissart Iguanodons: New Perspectives on Vertebrate Evolution and Early Cretaceous Ecosystems. Programme, Abstracts and Field Trips Guidebook 34
 A. Jiménez Vela and F. Pérez Lorente. 2007. El Corral del Totico. Dos nuevos yacimientos con pistas singulares. (Enciso, La Rioja, España) [El Corral del Totico. Two new localities with unique tracks. (Enciso, La Rioja, Spain)]. Zubía Monográfico 18–19:115-144 
 L. E. Requeta Loza, N. Hernández Medrano, and F. Pérez Lorente. 2007. La Pellejera: descripción y aportaciones. heterocronía y variabilidad de un yacimiento con huellas de dinosaurio de La Rioja (España) [La Pellejera: description and contributions: heterochrony and variability of a dinosaur footprint locality from La Rioja (Spain)]. Zubia Monográfico 18–19:21-114
 F. Pérez Lorente and A. Jiménez Vela. 2007. Barranco de Valdegutiérrez: un nuevo gran yacimiento de huellas de dinosaurio en La Rioja (España) [Barranco de Valdegutiérrez: a new large dinosaur footprint locality in La Rioja (Spain)]. Zubia Monográfico 18–19:9-20 
 F. Pérez Lorente. 2002. La distribución de yacimientos y de tipos de huellas de dinosaurios en la Cuenca de Cameroa (La Rioja, Burgos, Soria, España) [The distribution of localities and types of dinosaur footprints in the Cameros Basin (La Rioja, Burgos, Soria, Spain)]. Zubia Monográfico 14:191-210
 M. Blanco, S. Caro, A. López, F. Pérez Lorente, E. Requeta and M. Romero. 2000. El yacimiento de icnitas de dinosaurio del Cretácico Inferior de Las Losas (Enciso, La Rioja, España) [The Lower Cretaceous dinosaur footprint locality of Las Losas (Enciso, La Rioja, Spain)]. Zubía 18:97-138
 M. L. Casanovas, A. Fernández, F. Pérez Lorente and J. V. Santafé. 1997. Sauropod trackways from site El Sobaquillo (Munilla, La Rioja, Spain) indicate amble walking. Ichnos 5:101-107
 L. I. Viera and J. A. Torres. 1995. Presencia de Baryonyx walkeri (Saurischia, Theropoda) en el Weald de La Rioja (España). Nota previa [Presence of Baryonyx walkeri (Saurischia, Theropoda) in the Weald of La Rioja (Spain). Previous note]. Munibe 47:57-61
 J. J. Moratalla, J. García Mondéjar, V. F. Santos, M. G. Lockley, J. L. Sanz and S. Jiménez. 1995. Sauropod trackways from the Lower Cretaceous of Spain. In M. G. Lockley, V. F. dos Santos, C. A. Meyer, & A. P. Hunt (eds.), Aspects of Sauropod Paleobiology. GAIA 10:75-83
 M. L. Casanovas, R. Ezquerra, A. Fernández, F. Pérez Lorente, J. V. Santafé and F. Torcida. 1995. Huellas de dinosaurio en la Era del Peladillo 3 (La Rioja, España). Primera nota [Dinosaur tracks in the Era del Peladillo 3 (La Rioja, Spain). First notice]. Zubía 13:83-101
 M. L. Casanovas Cladellas, R. Ezquerra Miguel, A. Fernández Ortega, F. Pérez Lorente, J. V. Santafé Llopis and F. Torcida Fernández. 1994. Tracks of a herd of webbed ornithopods and other footprints found in the same site (Igea, La Rioja, Spain). Revue de Paléobiologie, Volume spéciale 7:29-36
 J. J. Moratalla, J. L. Sanz, S. Jimenez and M. G. Lockley. 1992. A quadrupedal ornithopod trackway from the Lower Cretaceous of La Rioja (Spain): inferences on gait and hand structure. Journal of Vertebrate Paleontology 12(2):150-157
 M. L. Casanovas, R. Ezquerra, A. Fernández, F. Pérez Lorente, J. V. Santafé and F. Torcida. 1992. Un grupo de saurópodos en el yacimento soto 2. La Rioja (España) [A group of sauropods in locality Soto 2. La Rioja (Spain)]. Zubía 10:45-52
 J. J. Moratalla, J. L. Sanz, and S. Jiménez. 1988. Nueva evidencia icnologica de dinosaurios en el Cretácico Inferior de La Rioja (España) [New ichnological evidence of dinosaurs in the Lower Cretaceous of La Rioja (Spain)]. Estudios Geológicos 44:119-131
 M. L. Casanovas Cladellas, F. Perez Lorente, J. V. Santafé Llopis and A. Fernández Ortega. 1985. Neuvos datos icnológicos del Cretácico inferior de la Sierra de Cameros (La Rioja, España) [New ichnological data from the Lower Cretaceous of Sierra de Cameros (La Rioja, Spain)]. Paleontologia i Evolució 19:3-18
 L. I. Viera, J. A. Torres, and L. M. Aguirrezabala. 1984. El Weald de Munilla (La Rioja) y sus icnitas de dinosaurios. (II) [The Wealden of Munilla (La Rioja) and its dinosaur footprints. (II)]. Munibe 36:3-22
 M. L. Casanovas Cladellas and J.-V. Santafé Llopis. 1974. Dos nuevos yacimientos de icnitas de Dinosaurios [Two new dinosaur footprint localities]. Acta Geològica Hispànica 9(3):88-91
 M. L. Casanovas Cladellas and J.-V. Santafé Llopis. 1971. Icnitas de reptiles mesozoicos en la provincia de Logroño [Mesozoic reptile footprints in Logroño province]. Acta Geològica Hispànica 6(5):139-142

Geologic groups of Europe
Geologic formations of Spain
Lower Cretaceous Series of Europe
Cretaceous Spain
Aptian Stage
Barremian Stage
Hauterivian Stage
Sandstone formations
Limestone formations
Deltaic deposits
Fluvial deposits
Lacustrine deposits
Shallow marine deposits
Open marine deposits
Ichnofossiliferous formations
Paleontology in Spain
Formations